Syricoris lacunana, the dark strawberry tortrix, is a small moth species of the family Tortricidae. It is found in the Palearctic realm.

Like its congeners, it is sometimes still placed in the genus Celypha.

Synonyms
Junior synonyms of this species are:
 Argyroploce lacunana var. lucivaganoides Strand, 1920
 Argyroploce symmathetes Caradja, 1916
 Celypha lacunana (Denis & Schiffermüller, 1775)
 Loxoterma lacunana (Denis & Schiffermüller, 1775)
 Olethreutes pallidana Hauder, 1918
 Orthotaenia alternana Curtis, 1831
 Pyralis decussana Fabricius, 1775
 Penthina lacunana var. hoffmanniana Teich, 1890
 Sericoris herbana Guenée, 1845
 Sericoris lacunana f. fuscoapicalis Strand, 1901
 Sericoris rooana Degraff, 1861
 Syricoris alticola Gibeaux, 1990
 Syricoris hoffmanniana (Teich, 1890)
 Syricoris lacunana alticola Gibeaux, 1990
 Syricoris lucivaganoides (Strand, 1920)
 Tortrix lacunana Denis & Schiffermüller, 1775

Description

The forewings show various shades of gray brown crossed by a few thin irregular silvery lines. These moths are quite variable and can be confused with some other species (Olethreutes obsoletana, Celypha doubledayana, Orthotaenia undulana).Julius von Kennel provides a full description.

Biology
The adult moths are active at dusk and fly from late April to September in the temperate part of their range (e.g. Belgium and the Netherlands). The caterpillars can be encountered from April to September.

It is a univoltine species. The larvae are polyphagous, feeding on various herbaceous plants (Daucus spec., Succisa spec., Ononis sp., Mentha sp., Caltha sp., Ranunculus sp., Inula sp., Cirsium sp., Chrysanthemum sp., Lysimachia sp., Chenopodium sp.. Urtica sp., Artemisia sp., Filipendula spec., Fragaria sp., Sanguisorba sp., Epilobium sp., Rubus sp., Salix sp., Betula sp., Ligustrum sp.. Larix spec., Picea sp.).

Distribution
It is present all over Europe, in most northern countries in the east Palearctic realm, and in the Near East.

Habitat
This very common species can be found in hedgerows, fields and woodland edges.

Footnotes

References
  (2009): Online World Catalogue of the Tortricidae – Syricoris lacunana. Version 1.3.1. Retrieved 2009-JAN-16.
  (2005): Markku Savela's Lepidoptera and some other life forms – Celypha. Version of 2005-SEP-14. Retrieved 2010-APR-16.

External links

 waarneming.nl 
 Lepidoptera of Belgium
 Celypha lacunana at UKMoths
 Irish Moths
 Fauna Europaea

Moths of Japan
Tortricidae of Europe
Insects of Turkey